The 1932 United States Senate election in Ohio took place on November 8, 1932. Incumbent Senator Robert J. Bulkley, who was elected to complete the unexpired term of Theodore Burton, was elected to a full term in office. This would be the last time that Democrats would win Ohio Class 3 Senate seat until Frank Lausche did so in 1956.

General election

Candidates
Gilbert Bettman, Attorney General of Ohio (Republican)
Robert J. Bulkley, incumbent Senator since 1930 (Democratic)
I. O. Ford (Socialist)
Frank M. Mecartney (Prohibition)

Results

See also 
 1932 United States Senate elections

References

1932
Ohio
United States Senate